Randolph County State Recreation Area is an Illinois state park on  in Randolph County, Illinois, United States.

References

State parks of Illinois
Protected areas of Randolph County, Illinois
Protected areas established in 1958
1958 establishments in Illinois